Shushicë is a village and a former municipality in the Elbasan County, central Albania. At the 2015 local government reform it became a subdivision of the municipality Elbasan. The population at the 2011 census was 8,731. The municipal unit consists of the villages Shushicë, Shelcan, Mlize, Hajdaran, Fush-Bull, Vasjan, Polis i Vogël, Polis Vale and Vreshtaj. The St. Nicholas' Church is close to the village.

References

Former municipalities in Elbasan County
Administrative units of Elbasan
Villages in Elbasan County